Aundha Nagnath Temple (Marathi: औंढा नागनाथ मंदिर) is an ancient Shiva temple, a Jyotirlinga, located at Aundha Nagnath in Hingoli district of Maharashtra, India.

History
Aundha Nagnath (Nageshwaram) is a Temple in Hingoli District in the state of Maharashtra, India, an important place of pilgrimage.   The present temple is said to have been built by the Seuna (Yadava) dynasty and dates to 13th century. The first temple is said to be from time of the Mahabharata and is believed to have been constructed by Yudhishthira, eldest of the Pandavas, when they were expelled for 14 years from Hastinapur. It has been stated that the temple building was seven-storeyed before it was sacked by Aurangzeb.

Structure

The temple covers an area of 669.60 sq mt (7200 sq ft) and height of 18.29 m (60 ft) The total area in which temple campus is spread is about 60,000 sq. ft. Apart from the religious significance, the temple itself is worth seeing for its beautiful carvings. The base of the present temple is in Hemadpanti architecture although its upper portion was repaired during later period and is in the style which was prevalent during the Peshwa's regime.

The Jyotirlinga is located below the ground level accessed by two deep steps. The Aundha Nagnath premises also house 12 small temples for the 12 Jyotirlingas. Also with in the premises are 108 temples and 68 shrines, all belonging to Lord Shiva.

Rebuilt 
This temple was destroyed during Aurangzeb's conquests. The present standing temple was rebuilt by Ahilyabai Holkar.

Narratives
The temple is also closely associated with lives of Namdev, Visoba Khechara and Dnyaneshwar, the sants revered by the Varkari sect of Hinduism.

Namdev met his guru, Visoba Khechara, at Aundha Nagnath Temple. He was advised to visit this temple by Jñāneśvar. According to the text Jñāndev Gatha, Jñāneśvar and Muktai instruct Namdev to journey to temple of Aundha Nagnath in search of a proper guru. In the temple, Namdev finds Visoba resting with his feet on the lingam, the symbol of Shiva. Namdev reproached him for having insulted Shiva. Visoba asked Namdev to place his feet elsewhere and wherever Namdev placed Visoba's feet, a lingam sprang up. Thus, through his yogic powers, Visoba filled the whole temple with Shiva-lingam and taught Namdev the omnipresence of God.

There is one famous story told about Namdev and Aundha Nagnath temple. Once when he was chanting Bhajans in front of the temple with his senior gurus like Jñāneśvar, Visoba Khechara and few more Varkari, the temple pujari told them their singing in front of the temple is disturbing their routine pooja and prayers and asked them to go away from temple. The temple pujari told Bhagat Namdev, insulted him and said he is of lower caste and why he has come to the temple. Then Bhagat Namdev went back side of the temple and started singing bhajans there. But God, in order to be in the sight of the pining devotee and listen bhajans, revolved the temple. It is testimonial to that miracle  why Nandi is located on back side of temple.

Guru Nanak, the founder of Sikhism is said to have visited Aundha Nagnath temple when he travelled this area and also visited Narsi Bamani, the birthplace of Namdev. It may be mentioned here that Namdev is also revered in Sikhism, as Bhagat Namdeo.

Fair
Every year a fair is held here in Hindu calendar month of Magha, which lasts till beginning of month of Phalguna.

References

 

Jyotirlingas
Hindu temples in Maharashtra
Tourist attractions in Hingoli district